Lake View Township or Lakeview Township may refer to:

Lake View Township, Cook County, Illinois, now Lake View, Chicago
Lake View Township, Becker County, Minnesota
Lakeview Township, Carlton County, Minnesota
Lakeview Township, Burke County, North Dakota, in Burke County, North Dakota
Lakeville Township, Grand Forks County, North Dakota, in Grand Forks, North Dakota
Lake View Township, Lake County, South Dakota, in Lake County, South Dakota

Township name disambiguation pages